Glen R. Eschtruth, M.D. (died 1977) was a Methodist medical missionary who operated a mission hospital in Kapanga, Zaire (now Congo-Kinshasa) from 1960 with his wife, Lena Eschtruth. Their daughter, Caroline Rush Eschtruth, was briefly married (1976–78) to American researcher Steven Hatfill.

In early 1977 Soviet- and Cuban-directed mercenaries invaded Zaire from Angola in the Shaba I invasion. With a number of other missionaries and aid workers in the Kapanga region, Glen and Lena were placed under house arrest by the invaders. When Zairian forces, with Western assistance, successfully repelled the invasion, Glen, on or about 15 April 1977, was seized by the mercenaries as they evacuated Kapanga, and his body was found in a shallow grave not far from Kapanga. Eschtruth was the only foreign national to be killed in the course of the invasion.

1977 deaths
American Methodist missionaries
People from Macomb County, Michigan
Year of birth missing
Methodist missionaries in the Democratic Republic of the Congo
Christian medical missionaries
American expatriates in the Democratic Republic of the Congo
American people murdered abroad
People murdered in the Democratic Republic of the Congo
1977 murders in Africa